L'Épine is a commune in the Marne department in the Grand Est region of north-eastern France.

See also
Notre-Dame de l'Épine
Communes of the Marne department

References 

Epine
World Heritage Sites in France